Davletovo (Däwlät) is a rural locality (a selo) and the administrative center of Davletovsky Selsoviet, Abzelilovsky District, Bashkortostan, Russia. The population was 941 as of 2010. There are 17 streets.

Geography 
Davletovo is located 12 km east of Askarovo (the district's administrative centre) by road. Kusheyevo is the nearest rural locality.

References 

Rural localities in Abzelilovsky District